The Middletown Guards were an American basketball team based in Middletown, Connecticut, that was a member of the American Basketball League.

The team dropped out of the league on January 8, 1953.

Year-by-year

References

Middletown, Connecticut
American Basketball League (1925–1955) teams
Basketball teams established in 1952
Basketball teams disestablished in 1953